Thomas Wheeler Williams (September 28, 1789 – December 31, 1874) was a U.S. Representative from Connecticut.

Born in Stonington, Connecticut, Williams attended the public schools.
At the age of fifteen was employed as a clerk in New York City, and before he was twenty-one was employed on a business mission to Norway, Sweden, and Russia.
For about eight years was engaged in the shipping business.
He moved to New London, Connecticut, in 1818 and became a prominent figure in the whaling business.

Williams was elected as a Whig to the Twenty-sixth and Twenty-seventh Congresses (March 4, 1839 – March 3, 1843).
He served as chairman of the Committee on Mileage (Twenty-sixth and Twenty-seventh Congresses).
He served as member of the State house of representatives in 1846 and 1847.
He served as president of the New London, Willamantic and Palmer Railroad (later the New London Northern Railroad) in 1847 and for many years thereafter.
He died in New London, Connecticut, December 31, 1874.
He was interred in Cedar Grove Cemetery.

References

1789 births
1874 deaths
Whig Party members of the United States House of Representatives from Connecticut
Members of the Connecticut House of Representatives
19th-century American politicians